is a railway station in the city of Shiroishi, Miyagi, Japan, operated by JR East.

Lines
It is located 601.0 kilometers from Tokyo Station.

Station layout
The station is an elevated station with one island platform and one side platform, with the station building located underneath. The station has a Midori no Madoguchi staffed ticket office.

Platforms

History
The station opened 23 June 1982. The station was absorbed into the JR East network upon the privatization of the Japanese National Railways (JNR) on 1 April 1987.

Passenger statistics
In fiscal 2018, the station was used by an average of 874 passengers daily (boarding passengers only).

Surrounding area 
 Shiroishi Station (20 minute walk)
 Site of Shiroishi Castle

See also
 List of railway stations in Japan

References

External links

  

Tōhoku Shinkansen
Railway stations in Miyagi Prefecture
Railway stations in Japan opened in 1982
Shiroishi, Miyagi